The West End-Elliott Overlook Park, often shortened to West End Overlook, is a small municipal park and scenic viewpoint in the Elliott neighborhood of Pittsburgh, Pennsylvania.

In 2003 the park was redesigned with landscaped gardens and a walkway under shade trees. Terraced stone banks provide seats for tourists. The park affords a sweeping view of the valleys of the Allegheny, Monongahela, and Ohio Rivers as well as Downtown Pittsburgh.

References

External links

 West Pittsburgh Partnership
 Matthew Johnson Photography - Sunset from the West End Overlook

Allegheny River
Monongahela River
Ohio River
Parks in Pittsburgh
Urban public parks